Pamabrom manufactured by Chattem Chemicals, and is a  product included in retail drugs available in over-the-counter medications. The active diuretic ingredient in pamabrom is 8-bromotheophylline and it also contains aminoisobutanol.

Pamabrom is available in combination with acetaminophen (paracetamol) for various conditions such as back pain and menstrual relief. The acetaminophen helps reduce menstrual pains and the pamabrom reduces associated bloating. The combination is available in a number of products from various brands under different names. The dosages are essentially the same for each brand, including generic drug store varieties.

A diuretic is also used to reduce fluid buildup in the body. When the body has fluid buildup, it can cause swelling of the extremities, like in your ankles and feet. Excess fluid can make it harder for your heart to work properly. Buildup of these fluids are sometimes related to congestive heart failure.

References

External links 
 Are 'For-Women' Products for Real?
 https://www.webmd.com/hypertension-high-blood-pressure/guide/diuretic-treatment-high-blood-pressure#1

Diuretics
Xanthines
Organobromides